Annobón, and formerly as Anno Bom and Annabona, is a province (smallest province in both area and population) of Equatorial Guinea consisting of the island of Annobón, formerly also Pigalu and Pagalu, and its associated islets in the Gulf of Guinea. According to the 2015 census, Annobón had 5,314 inhabitants, a small population increase from the 5,008 registered by the 2001 census. The official language is Spanish but most of the inhabitants speak a creole form of Portuguese. The island's main industries are fishing and forestry.

Annobón is the only island of the country located in the Southern Hemisphere of the Atlantic Ocean. The provincial capital is San Antonio de Palé on the north side of the island; the other town is Mabana, formerly known as San Pedro. The roadstead is relatively safe, and some passing vessels take advantage of it in order to obtain water and fresh provisions, of which Annobón has offered an abundant supply. However, there is no regular shipping service to the rest of Equatorial Guinea, and ships call as infrequently as every few months.

Name 
It was named for the date of its discovery by the Portuguese on New Year's Day in 1473.

During the final years of the Francisco Macías Nguema administration, the island was called Pigalu and Pagalu, from the Portuguese  (parrot). In Spanish it is known as the Provincia de Annobón (Province of Annobón).

Geography and geology 

Its central crater lake is named Lago A Pot and its highest peak is Quioveo, which rises . The island is characterized by a succession of lush valleys and steep mountains, covered with rich woods and luxuriant vegetation.

Annobón is often described as being "in the Gulf of Guinea", like the neighboring islands of São Tomé and Príncipe, but the formal boundary line for the Gulf of Guinea established by the International Hydrographic Organization actually runs north of it.

History 
The island was discovered by the Portuguese on January 1, 1473; it obtained its name from that date ("New Year"). However, Spanish explorer Diego Ramirez de la Diaz first spotted the island in 1470 and named it San Antonio. It was apparently uninhabited until colonized under the Portuguese from 1474, primarily by Africans from Angola via São Tomé Island. These slaves (who the Portuguese called escravos de regate) are considered the first members of Annobonese society.

Beginning in the early sixteenth century, many of these slaves who were now marrying Europeans gave birth to the next generations of Annobonese who were called forros (slaves about to be free). Forros began to develop a distinct identity and socio-economic powers. This period also saw the emergence of the Creole Annobonese language.

The island was passed to Spain by the 1778 Treaty of El Pardo. The treaty granted Spain control of the Portuguese islands of Annobón and Fernando Po (now Bioko) and the Guinea coast between the Niger and the Ogooué in exchange for Spanish acceptance of the Portuguese occupation of territories in Brazil west of the line established by the Treaty of Tordesillas. The Spanish colony thus formed would eventually be known as Spanish Guinea.

The island's populace was opposed to the arrangement and hostile toward the Spaniards. After the handover and when the Spanish flag was hoisted to affirm Spanish sovereignty, the islanders revolted against the newcomers, in part because they were considered heretical for placing dogs on their flag (the actual design represents lions). They expelled them according to a tradition of throwing witches to the sea. A state of anarchy ensued, leading to an arrangement by which the island was administered by a body of five natives, each of whom held the office of governor during the period that elapsed until ten ships landed at the island. This autonomous government continued, with the island claimed by both Spain and Portugal, until the authority of Spain was re-established in the latter part of the 19th century. The island briefly became part of the Elobey, Annobón and Corisco colony until 1909.

The British erected a fort at "St Antony" in 1801, eventually legalized through a lease from the Spanish government in 1827. The base was used by the British to suppress the Atlantic slave trade.

During the final years of the administration of Francisco Macías Nguema, the first president of Equatorial Guinea, the island was called Pigalu or Pagalu. The population felt prejudice against them in Equatorial Guinea and some began advocating separatist movements. In 1993, the central government isolated the island, expelling foreigners including humanitarian organizations. The population rebelled and attacked the governor's residence. The government replied with two extrajudicial executions. International pressure eased hostilities, and political prisoners were released.

It was mostly due to this small island that Equatorial Guinea asked for observer status just after the Community of Portuguese Language Countries was formed in 1996, which led to a visit to Equatorial Guinea, in 1998, by the Portuguese foreign minister, Jaime Gama. Its historic, ethnographic, and religious identity is reflected in its provincial flag. In 2006, Equatorial Guinea achieved observer status with the hand of São Tomé and Príncipe, it kept lobbying to become a full member, contrary to international pressure that wanted to isolate the country due to human rights violations, becoming a full member in 2014 with the very active support of Portuguese-speaking Africa, with the Portuguese language being restored as an official language.

Flora and fauna 

Originally, this small equatorial island  from the Gabonese coast was uninhabited and had great biological diversity. With colonization, islanders used rafts or "cayucos" (canoe-like boats), and hunted humpback whales, whale calves, and other cetaceans with harpoons near to the island.

Today the Annobón white-eye (Zosterops griseovirescens) and the Annobón paradise flycatcher (Terpsiphone smithii) are endemic passeri (songbirds), as is the São Tomé Island or Malherbi pigeon (Columba malherbii). There are 29 species of bird on the island as well as 2 bat species (1 endemic); reptiles (5 species endemics): 1 snake, 3 geckos, 2 scincid lizards, 3 marine turtles; river fish: 18 species (1 endemic); mosquitoes, scorpions, and huge centipedes. Introduced domestic animals include fish, guinea fowl, rats, dogs, and cats. The island has no indigenous mammalian predators. Sharks are found in the surrounding sea.

There are 208 species of vascular plant (of which 15% are endemic) including the "point up" baobab, ceiba (used for cayuco construction), ficus, ferns and tree ferns, and great moss masses.

Administration 

The capital of the province is San Antonio de Palé (formerly St Antony). The island has three community councils (Consejos de Poblados): Anganchi, Aual, and Mabana.

Demographics 
The island's inhabitants are of mixed Portuguese and Angolan descent, with some Spanish admixture. The early anti-Spanish sentiment, combined with the isolation from mainland Equatorial Guinea and the proximity of São Tomé and Príncipe—which is just  from the island—has helped preserve the island's cultural ties with Portugal. Its culture is very similar to that of São Tomé and the Afro-Portuguese peoples throughout Africa. The population is Catholic, although with some form of syncretism, and religiosity remains a central feature of local lifestyle.

The island had an estimated population of 3000 through most of the 19th century.

Languages 
The island's main language is a Portuguese creole known as the Annobonese language (Fa d'Ambu) or Falar de Ano Bom (Portuguese for Annobón Speech). The Portuguese creole has vigorous use in Annobón. It is common in all domains except government and education where Spanish is used. Spanish is not much spoken in Annobón. Non-creolized Portuguese is used as a liturgical language by local Catholics. In February 2012, Equatorial Guinea's foreign minister signed an agreement with the IILP (Instituto Internacional da Língua Portuguesa) on the promotion of Portuguese in Equatorial Guinea. The adoption of Portuguese followed the announcement on 13 July 2007 by the President of Equatorial Guinea and a 2010 Constitutional Law which established Portuguese as an official language of the Republic.

Economy 
Annobón is of strategic importance to Equatorial Guinea as through its ownership the Equatorial Guinean government claims extensive maritime territory to the south of its neighbour, São Tomé and Príncipe (which itself lies to the south of Equatorial Guinea's main land mass). Oil in the Gulf of Guinea represents more than 80% of Equatorial Guinea's economy, though supplies from current reserves were predicted by some sources to run out before 2020. Although no drilling is currently taking place in São Tomé, there are estimated to be  of oil within its marine borders. Equatorial Guinea claims the right to explore for and produce hydrocarbons in a huge area of sea surrounding Annobón that stretches from 1°N to almost 5°S, and from 2°E to 7°E, an area larger than the entire land and sea borders of the rest of Equatorial Guinea.

Environment 
According to many different sources, there is evidence of large-scale dumping of toxic waste on the remote island of Annobón, at least during the 1980s and 1990s. The German edition of Der Spiegel on 28 August 2006 reported that the government of Equatorial Guinea sold permits to UK and US companies to bury 10 million metric tons of toxic waste and 7 million metric tons of radioactive waste on the island of Annobón. Teodoro Obiang Nguema Mbasogo, president of Equatorial Guinea, supposedly receives 200 million US dollars per year for renewed permits, while the population of Annobón lives in extreme poverty. The report also showed evidence that the whole island's ecosystem is about to collapse due to the massive waste dumping.

See also 
 Provinces of Equatorial Guinea

Notes

References

Sources

External links 

 Gulf of Guinea Conservation Group
 UN VALIOSO RECURSO NATURAL: EL BOSQUE NEBLINOSO DE ANNOBON 
 Ghuty Mamae: La esencia de Annobón 

 
Gulf of Guinea
Islands of Equatorial Guinea
Provinces of Equatorial Guinea
Volcanoes of Equatorial Guinea
Former colonies in Africa
Former Portuguese colonies
Former Spanish colonies
Portuguese colonisation in Africa
Spanish Africa
States and territories established in 1474
15th-century establishments in Africa
Ramsar sites in Equatorial Guinea